Meharia tanganyikae is a moth in the family Cossidae. It is found in eastern Africa.

References

Moths described in 1952
Meharia
Insects of Tanzania
Moths of Africa